Ken E. Mendenhall (born August 11, 1948) is a former American football center who played ten seasons in the National Football League (NFL) for the Baltimore Colts.

Born in Stillwater, Mendenhall grew up in Pawhuska in Osage County, Oklahoma.  He later attended Enid High School and went on to play for the University of Oklahoma, where he was "described as a devastating one-on-one blocker."

As a 1969 All-American center, he was valued by his college teammates.  "He's always got the path cleared for you," said tailback Steve Owens. "He's fantastic coming off the ball on a man right in front of him. I'm glad we have him up there."  In fact, "he cleared the way for Owens, who is OU's all-time leading scorer" and 1969 Heisman Trophy winner.

Drafted in the fifth-round of the 1970 NFL Draft by the Atlanta Falcons, Mendenhall was traded several times (including the Houston Oilers) before landing with the Baltimore Colts where he played out his 10-season career.  After the Colts' 1980 season, he retired from professional football with the distinction of having "started 118 consecutive games for the Colts, beginning in the fourth game of 1973 and continuing through the last game of 1980."

References

1948 births
Living people
People from Pawhuska, Oklahoma
People from Stillwater, Oklahoma
Sportspeople from Enid, Oklahoma
Players of American football from Oklahoma
American football centers
Enid High School alumni
Oklahoma Sooners football players
Baltimore Colts players
Ed Block Courage Award recipients